"Peace through strength" is a phrase that suggests that military power can help preserve peace. It has been used by many leaders from Roman Emperor Hadrian in the second century AD to former US President Ronald Reagan in the 1980s. The concept has long been associated with realpolitik. The idea has critics, with Andrew Bacevich stating, Peace through strength' easily enough becomes 'peace through war.

History
The phrase and the concept date to ancient times. Roman Emperor Hadrian (AD 76–138) is said to have sought "peace through strength or, failing that, peace through threat." Hadrian's Wall was a symbol of the policy.

United States
The first US president, George Washington, enunciated a policy of peace through strength in his fifth annual message to Congress, the 1793 State of the Union Address. He said:
There is a rank due to the United States among nations which will be withheld, if not absolutely lost, by the reputation of weakness. If we desire to avoid insult, we must be able to repel it; if we desire to secure peace, one of the most powerful instruments of our rising prosperity, it must be known that we are at all times ready for war.

In Federalist No. 24, Alexander Hamilton argued for peace through strength by stating that strong garrisons in the west and a navy in the east would protect the Union from the threat of Britain and Spain.

Peace Through Strength is the motto of the Eighth Air Force, established in 1944.

Peace Through Strength (1952) is the title of a book about a defense plan by Bernard Baruch, a World War II adviser to US President Franklin D. Roosevelt, published by Farrar, Straus and Young. During the 1964 presidential campaign in the United States, the Republican Party spent about $5 million on "Peace through Strength" TV spots. For supporters of the MX missile in the 1970s, the missile symbolized "peace through strength."

Republican Party
In 1980, Ronald Reagan used the phrase during his election challenge against Jimmy Carter by accusing the incumbent of weak, vacillating leadership that invited enemies to attack the United States and its allies. Reagan later considered it one of the mainstays of his foreign policy as president. In 1986, he explained it thus:
We know that peace is the condition under which mankind was meant to flourish. Yet peace does not exist of its own will. It depends on us, on our courage to build it and guard it and pass it on to future generations. George Washington's words may seem hard and cold today, but history has proven him right again and again. "To be prepared for war," he said, "is one of the most effective means of preserving peace." Well, to those who think strength provokes conflict, Will Rogers had his own answer. He said of the world heavyweight champion of his day: "I've never seen anyone insult Jack Dempsey."

The approach has been credited for forcing the Soviet Union to lose the arms race and end the Cold War. "Peace Through Strength" is the official motto of the Nimitz-class nuclear-powered aircraft carrier, USS Ronald Reagan (CVN-76).

"Peace Through Strength" has appeared in every party platform of the Republican Party since 1980.

On assuming office in January 2017, Donald Trump cited the idea of "Peace Through Strength" as central to his overall "America First" foreign policy. As such the introduction to US National Defense Strategy of 2018 states: The US force posture combined with the allies will "preserve peace through strength". The document proceeds to detail what "achieving peace through strength requires".

Criticism
For Andrew Bacevich, "belief in the efficacy of military power almost inevitably breeds the temptation to put that power to work. 'Peace through strength' easily enough becomes 'peace through war.

Jim George of Australian National University used the term to describe part of what he argued was the Straussian and neoconservative foreign policy of the George W. Bush administration.

The mock inversion "strength through peace" has been used on occasion to draw criticism to the militaristic system of diplomacy advocated by "peace through strength". Ohio Representative Dennis Kucinich adopted the slogan "Strength Through Peace" during his 2008 presidential run as part of his platform as a peace candidate against the Iraq War.

Trademark dispute
During Reagan's presidency, the non-profit American Security Council Foundation (ASCF) and its for-profit direct-mail provider, Communications Corporation of America, sought to influence United States foreign policy by promoting the idea, but after the Soviet collapse of 1991, ASCF fell into obscurity, and other organizations continued to promote the slogan. The Heritage Foundation and the Center for Security Policy (CSP) have also used the term in print. The ASCF registered a trademark for the phrase in April 2011. In September 2012, ASCF filed a trademark infringement lawsuit against CSP and Frank Gaffney, prompting the Washington City Paper to ridicule ASCF's Director of Operations, Gary James, for editing the online encyclopedia Wikipedia article titled 'Peace through strength' so that it was "drenched in ... ASCF references".  Following a counterclaim by the CSP alleging that the trademark application had been fraudulent, in August 2013 the ACSF announced that it had settled the lawsuit with the CSP and would cancel its trademark claim.

See also
Big Stick ideology
Collective security
Demoralization (warfare)
Doublethink in the 1949 novel Nineteen Eighty-Four, which features the phrase "war is peace"
Gunboat diplomacy
Mutual assured destruction
Pax Americana
Reagan Doctrine
Si vis pacem, para bellum
World peace
Security dilemma

References 

Military doctrines
International security
International relations terminology
National security
Peace
Nuclear warfare